This is a list of critics for various artistic disciplines.

Architecture

Allison Arieff
Robert Campbell
Justine Clark
Justin Davidson
Martin Filler
Kenneth Frampton
Elizabeth Farrelly
Jonathan Glancey
Paul Goldberger
Laura Harding
Edwin Heathcote
Ada Louise Huxtable
Blair Kamin
Philip Kennicott
Michael Kimmelman
Alexandra Lange
Wanda Lau
Nancy Levinson
Esther McCoy
Cathleen McGuigan
Rowan Moore
Lewis Mumford
Herbert Muschamp
Hugh Pearman
Christian Narkiewicz-Laine
Nicolai Ouroussoff
Aline B. Saarinen
Inga Saffron
Catherine Slessor
Michael Sorkin
Naomi Stead
Allan Temko
Oliver Wainwright

Art

Dance

Film

Literature

Harold Bloom
Saveria Chemotti
Jonathan Dollimore
Frances Ferguson
Stanley Fish
Northrop Frye
Susan Gubar
Jeanne Halbwachs
Claudia L. Johnson
Frank Kermode
Iya Kiva
C. S. Lewis
David Lodge
Marshall McLuhan
Ira B. Nadel
Azar Nafisi
John Neal
Eli Siegel
Lionel Trilling
Geeta Tripathee

Music

Theater

Ben Brantley
Richard L. Coe
David Cote
Charles Isherwood
Walter Kerr
Octavian Saiu
John Simon
Larry Stark
Alexander Woollcott

Television

Álvaro Cueva
Andy Dehnart
John Doyle
Ian Hyland
Marvin Kitman
Frazier Moore
James Poniewozik
Alan Sepinwall
Tom Shales
Jim Shelley
Alessandra Stanley
Jay Nelson Tuck

Other disciplines

Jacques Barzun
Walter Benjamin
Whitwell Elwin (1816–1900) literature and social
bell hooks
Camille Paglia
Susan Sontag

See also

 List of chief music critics
 Lists of people by occupation

References

 
Lists of people by occupation
Lists of visual art topics
Literature lists
 
 
Music-related lists
 
Theatre-related lists